Benjamin Franklin "Benjy (Benji)" Dial (May 21, 1943 – April 5, 2001) was an American football quarterback who played one season with the Philadelphia Eagles of the National Football League (NFL). He was drafted by the Pittsburgh Steelers in the thirteenth round of the 1966 NFL Draft. He played college football at Eastern New Mexico University and attended Farwell High School in Farwell, Texas. He was in Washington Redskins training camp but was released on September 1, 1970. Dial was also a member of the Winnipeg Blue Bombers of the Canadian Football League, as well as teams from various other leagues.

References

External links
Just Sports Stats
Fanbase profile
Benji Dial trading card

1943 births
2001 deaths
Players of American football from Memphis, Tennessee
Players of American football from Texas
Players of Canadian football from Memphis, Tennessee
American football quarterbacks
Canadian football quarterbacks
American players of Canadian football
Eastern New Mexico Greyhounds football players
Philadelphia Eagles players
Winnipeg Blue Bombers players
People from Memphis, Texas
People from Parmer County, Texas